851 Naval Air Squadron was a Fleet Air Arm squadron of the Royal Navy, first formed in October 1943 at Squantum Naval Air Station in Massachusetts, United States as a MAC-ship escort squadron. It was later disbanded around December 1945.

It was reformed in 1954 as an Australian squadron on 3 August 1954.

History 

After pilot training the squadron was formed in October 1943, equipped with Grumman Avenger IIs to operate as a torpedo bomber reconnaissance and escort squadron. They sailed to the Indian Ocean via Williamstown docks, Australia to Cochin, where the carrier's deck cargo of aircraft was unloaded, thus enabling 851 Squadron's naval flying operations for the first time. Tasked with anti-submarine patrols in the Indian Ocean and Bay of Bengal, 851 Squadron's Avengers and Wildcat flights briefly operated from a shore base at Colombo Racecourse, then at Katukurunda, as well as forming the Shahs full complement.

Sinking of U-198 
On 10 and 12 August 1944 the U-boat was located near the Seychelles and attacked by 851's Avengers, although damage could not be clearly ascertained. The aircraft directed the RN frigate  and the Indian sloop  to the submarine and they were able to sink U-198 with the loss of all hands.

Sinking of Haguro 
In February 1945 Shah sailed to Durban for a refit, and the Wildcats were withdrawn. Sailing to Burma in May 1945, Shah with 851 Squadron's Avengers supported Operation Dracula, the invasion of Rangoon. 851 Squadron dive-bombed the Japanese heavy cruiser , suffering losses in the attacks for little return. This was the longest range Fleet Air Arm round-trip carrier borne attack of the Second World War. However, they did direct ships of the 26th Destroyer Flotilla which sank Haguro in a night torpedo action known as Operation Dukedom.

Decommissioning 
The squadron subsequently returned to Katukurunda, Colombo Racecourse and Trincomalee.  After VJ-Day the squadron left their aircraft and sailed on HMS Shah to the UK where the squadron was disbanded and the carrier returned to the United States.

851 Squadron was subsequently reactivated as a squadron of the Royal Australian Navy.

References

External links
 Fleet Air Arm Archive 851 Naval Air Squadron

851
Military units and formations established in 1943
Military units and formations in Massachusetts